Sorrow and Joy is a 2013 Danish drama film directed by Nils Malmros. The autobiographical film recounts the tragic event in which Malmros' wife, suffering from bipolar disorder, killed their infant daughter with a knife. It was selected as the Danish entry for the Best Foreign Language Film at the 87th Academy Awards, but was not nominated.

Cast
Jakob Cedergren as Johannes
Helle Fagralid as Signe
Ida Dwinger as Else
Kristian Halken as Laurits
Nicolas Bro as Birkemose
Helle Hertz as Johannes' mother
Niels Weyde as Johannes' father
Søren Pilmark as Lawyer

See also
 List of submissions to the 87th Academy Awards for Best Foreign Language Film
 List of Danish submissions for the Academy Award for Best Foreign Language Film

References

External links

2013 films
2013 drama films
Danish drama films
Films directed by Nils Malmros
2010s Danish-language films